The Mixed Doubles tournament of the 2012 Asian Junior Badminton Championships was held from July 3–7 in Gimcheon, South Korea. The gold medalist in the last edition were Lukhi Apri Nugroho and Ririn Amelia from Indonesia. The top seeded Edi Subaktiar / Melati Daeva Oktaviani from Indonesia beaten by Chinese pair, eventual silver medalist Wang Yilu / Huang Dongping in the quarterfinals round. Vietnamese and Chinese pairs Do Tuan Duc / Le Thu Huyen and Liu Yuchen / Chen Qingchen finished in the semifinals round, settle for the bronze medal. Host players, the second seeded Choi Sol-gyu / Chae Yoo-jung emerged as the champion after beat Wang / Huang of China in the finals with the rubber games 17–21, 25–23, 23–21.

Seeded

  Edi Subaktiar / Melati Daeva Oktaviani (quarter-final)
  Choi Sol-gyu / Chae Yoo-jung (champion)
  Tan Wee Gieen / Chow Mei Kuan (quarter-final)
  Koshun Miura / Akane Watanabe (second round)
  Alfian Eko Prasetya / Shella Devi Aulia (third round)
  Hafiz Faizal / Maretha Dea Giovani (second round)
  Jun Bong-chan / Lee So-hee (third round)
  Putra Eka Rhoma / Ni Ketut Mahadewi Istirani (third round)

Draw

Finals

Top Half

Section 1

Section 2

Section 3

Section 4

Bottom Half

Section 5

Section 6

Section 7

Section 8

References

External links 
Main Draw

Mixed
Asia Junior